Gary Savage (born 12 June 1978) is a South African-born Argentine cricketer who has played for Argentina since the 2006 season.

Savage debuted in Argentina's victorious World Cricket League performances of the first half of 2006, as the Argentine team were promoted from Division Two into Division One. These matches included one in which Savage scored a half-century, against Suriname.

Savage is a seam bowler who became the Division Two "Player of the Tournament" thanks to Argentina's charge toward promotion. He played in the 2013 ICC World Cricket League Division Six tournament.

References

1978 births
Living people
Argentine cricketers
South African emigrants to Argentina